Michael Opitz (born 16 July 1962) is a retired German footballer who played as a defensive midfielder for Schalke 04. He completed 158 matches in the Bundesliga and made 66 appearances in the 2. Bundesliga for the club.

References

External links 
 
 

1962 births
Living people
German footballers
Germany under-21 international footballers
Association football midfielders
Bundesliga players
2. Bundesliga players
FC Schalke 04 players
Sportfreunde Siegen players